Bulwark primarily refers to:

 Bulwark (nautical), a nautical term for the extension of a ship's side above the level of a weather deck
 Bastion, a structure projecting outward from the curtain wall of a fortification

The Bulwark primarily refers to:
 The Bulwark (novel), a 1946 posthumous novel by Theodore Dreiser
 The Bulwark (website), an neoconservative American news website launched in 2018

Bulwark may also refer to:

Places 
 Bulwark, Chepstow, Wales
 Bulwark, Alberta, Canada
 Bulwark Stream, a meltwater stream in Antarctica

Ships 
 Bulwark-class battleship (1859), a class of Royal Navy wooden battleships
 HMS Bulwark, the name of several Royal Navy ships
 USS Bulwark, the name of several U.S. Navy ships

Other uses 
 Bulwark (comics), a fictional character in Marvel comics
 Bulwark (horse), sire of Åby Stora Pris winners
 Bulwark Protective Apparel, an American company

See also

Breakwater (structure)